Kristin Bekkevold Sørum (born 19 April 1977 in Hamar) is a former Norwegian footballer and Olympic champion.

She received a gold medal at the 2000 Summer Olympics in Sydney.

In January 2001 Bekkevold underwent surgery for a knee injury. She left Asker in 2002 and returned to playing for FL Fart. When Fart won the 1. divisjon in 2007, they were promoted and Bekkevold made a Toppserien comeback in 2008. She signed for Brumunddal, who she had previously represented between 1994 and 1996, in February 2009. Bekkevold left Brumunddal and retired from football at the age of 34 after suffering another knee injury.

References

External links
 
 National team statistics 

1977 births
Living people
Norwegian women's footballers
Norway women's international footballers
Footballers at the 2000 Summer Olympics
Olympic footballers of Norway
Olympic gold medalists for Norway
Olympic medalists in football
Asker Fotball (women) players
Toppserien players
Sportspeople from Hamar
Medalists at the 2000 Summer Olympics
Women's association football central defenders